The Greatest Hits Tour (also known as The Farewell Tour) was the twelfth concert tour by Irish boy band, Westlife. The tour, visited the Europe and Asia and supported the group's compilation album, Greatest Hits. After the tour finished, the group disbanded after performing for 14 years until their reformation in 2018.

The last show, on 23 June 2012 was aired live via satellite from Croke Park, Dublin to cinemas all across Europe, Ireland, Belgium, the Czech Republic, South Africa, Estonia, Indonesia and Denmark. Delayed screenings will be shown in cinemas in Indonesia, Australia, and South Africa in July and August 2012. The encore was also shown again in select cinemas across UK on 26 June 2012. The band was the 34th top-grossing tour act of the year and 12th in the midyear list with earnings of $35.2 million (€27 million). The farewell tour consisted of 8 dates in China and 33 in the UK and Ireland culminating in 2 nights at Croke Park in June. In total the band sold 489,694 tickets at an average price of $71.85 (€55) each. The final nights at the said stadium were officially the 11th largest attendance at an outdoor stadium worldwide.

They released a DVD in 2012 from the tour which went to number 1 in the UK and Irish charts, staying for 30 weeks in the charts. BBC later produced a live album from this tour titled "The Farewell Tour: Live in Croke Park" which was released in 2014.

Background
In October 2011, the group revealed plans for the release of a compilation album, spanning their entire career. Many media outlets speculated the band would tour the album. An official announcement was made on 18 October 2011, a mere week after ending their previous tour in Southeast Asia. On the statement released on the group's website, it reported they would perform all 14 of their number one hits along with other favourites. After announcing the tour, tabloids rumoured the band would break-up after their tour was done. On 20 October 2011, the members of the band made an official announcement of their disbanding.

Opening acts
Lilygreen & Maguire (Europe, select dates)
Glenn Cal (Europe, select dates)
Vanquish (Europe, select dates)
Wy Mac (Wynona Leigh McCullough)  (Belfast, select dates)
Jedward (Dublin)
The Wanted (Dublin)
Lawson (Dublin)

Set list

Tour dates

Box office score data

Personnel

Vocals 
 Shane Filan
 Mark Feehily
 Kian Egan
 Nicky Byrne

Crew 
Simon Ellis - Musical Director

Live Concert Music DVD

Chart performance

Certifications and sales

External links
Westlife's Official Website

References

Westlife concert tours
Farewell concert tours
2012 concert tours